Tritonoturris paucicostata is a species of sea snail, a marine gastropod mollusk in the family Raphitomidae.

Description
The length of the shell attains 11 mm, its diameter 3.5 mm.

(Original description) The shell is elongately fusiform, thin and shining. The whorls are ornamented with varices, remote, and fine transverse raised striae. The outer lip is thin. The aperture is elongate-oval. The siphonal canal is long and slightly recurved. The colour of the shell is white, with irregular orange-brown spots or blotches. The varices are white.

Distribution
This marine species occurs off Hawaii.

References

External links
  Powell A.W.B.(1966) The molluscan families Speightiidae and Turridae: an evaluation of the valid taxa, both recent and fossil, with lists of characteristic species; Bulletin of the Auckland Institute and Museum ; no. 5
  Kay, E. A. (1979). Hawaiian marine shells. Reef and shore fauna of Hawaii. Section 4: Mollusca. Bernice P. Bishop Museum Special Publications. 64xviii + 1–653
 Moretzsohn, Fabio, and E. Alison Kay. "HAWAIIAN MARINE MOLLUSCS." (1995)
 
 Gastropods.com: Tritonoturris paucicostata

paucicostata
Gastropods described in 1860